Kurlson Benjamin (born 7 December 1984) is a Dominican footballer who currently plays for Dominican side Bath Estate and the Dominica national football team.

He plays as a striker. He is currently his country's all-time top goalscorer with 14 goals.

Club career
Born in Dominica, he joined Bath Estate in 2007.

Near the end of 2010 he played in Guyana's Kashif and Shanghai cup competition for Alpha United as a guest player alongside Grenada international Kithson Bain.

International career
He made his debut for Dominica on 18 January 2008 against Guadeloupe. It took him until his fourth game to score, when he netted in a 4–0 win over the British Virgin Islands. He netted his second goal, in a 2–0 win over Barbados in a friendly. Just a day later he scored all three of Dominica's goals as he scored a hat-trick against the same team. On 15 October 2010, he scored five in a 10–0 win over the British Virgin Islands in the Caribbean Cup, he scored another two later in the tournament as Dominica were beaten 4–2 by Cuba.

International goals
Scores and results list Dominica's goal tally first.

References

External links

Caribbean Football Database profile

1984 births
Living people
Association football forwards
Dominica footballers
Dominica international footballers
Bath Estate FC players
Expatriate footballers in Guyana
Alpha United FC players